Simone Boccanegra (died 1363) was the first Doge of Genoa. He became doge in 1339, but was ousted from power six years later. He regained the position in 1356, retaining it until his death in 1363.

His story was popularized by Antonio García Gutiérrez's 1843 play Simón Bocanegra and Giuseppe Verdi's 1857 opera Simon Boccanegra.

Family background 
Simone Boccanegra belonged to the wealthy Genoese Boccanegra family of merchants, a family that had among its members Guglielmo Boccanegra, who in 1257 became a virtual dictator of the Republic of Genoa when an insurrection against the government of the old aristocracy made him gain the control of the republic. Guglielmo Boccanegra was also the commissioner, in 1260, of the building of Palazzo San Giorgio, the future seat of republican power in the republic.

Life as doge
Boccanegra was elected doge for life on 23 December 1339. Boccanegra was opposed by the aristocratic faction, representing the old mercantile patriciate, which his first actions excluded from public life. With the old patriciate excluded from power, a new class of mercantile houses arose: Adorno, Guarco, Fregoso, and Montaldo. During Boccanegra's dogate, Genoese control was extended the length of both the French and Italian Rivieras, with the exception of the Grimaldi holdings in Monaco and Ventimiglia.

Simone's brother Egidio, was a grand admiral in the service of Alfonso XI of Castile, and inflicted a memorable defeat on a Moroccan fleet off Algeciras in 1344.

There were constant conspiracies and even attempts against Boccanegra's life from the start. (The first conspirator's head rolled on 20 December 1339.) This led to the establishment of a bodyguard of 103 mounted soldiers. For Boccanegra's security, these were drawn from Pisa, the inveterate enemy of Genoa, where, however, Simone's brother Niccolò was "Capitano del popolo", their mother having been a Pisan aristocrat.

Resignation and death

Boccanegra was forced to resign his office at a public meeting he had called on 23 December 1345. He was succeeded by Giovanni I di Murta, who died in early January 1350 and then by Giovanni II Valente, who ruled as chief magistrate, until Boccanegra regained power in 1356.

Boccanegra died in 1363, possibly having been poisoned by agents of his enemies.

In culture

The humanist poet Petrarch wrote letters to the people of Genoa and to the doge of Venice  appealing to them to end their fratricidal wars and find a common aim. These letters were among Verdi's inspirations for the revision of the opera in 1881.

Simone Boccanegra's tomb in the no longer extant church of San Francesco in Castelletto was decorated with a remarkable funeral sculpture, depicting him as if lying in state with extraordinary realism in his features. This sculpture is now in the Museum of Sant'Agostino.

See also
Boccanegra
Egidio Boccanegra

References

External links

   Il primo doge: Simone Boccanegra
  Sources for Genoese history
 Funeral statue from Simone Boccanegra's tomb

1301 births
1363 deaths
14th-century Doges of Genoa
Assassinated Italian politicians
Deaths by poisoning
Year of birth unknown
Simone